Oyeronke Akindele (born 8 April 1946) is a Nigerian sprinter. She competed in the women's 100 metres at the 1968 Summer Olympics.

References

External links

1946 births
Living people
Athletes (track and field) at the 1966 British Empire and Commonwealth Games
Athletes (track and field) at the 1968 Summer Olympics
Nigerian female sprinters
Olympic athletes of Nigeria
Commonwealth Games competitors for Nigeria
Olympic female sprinters
20th-century Nigerian women
21st-century Nigerian women